
Gmina Łabowa is a rural gmina (administrative district) in Nowy Sącz County, Lesser Poland Voivodeship, in southern Poland.

Villages
Gmina Łabowa contains the villages and settlements of Barnowiec, Czaczów, Kamianna, Kotów, Krzyżówka, Łabowa, Łabowiec, Łosie, Maciejowa, Nowa Wieś, Roztoka Wielka, Składziste and Uhryń.

Neighbouring gminas
Gmina Łabowa is bordered by the gminas of Grybów, Kamionka Wielka, Krynica-Zdrój, Muszyna, Nawojowa and Piwniczna-Zdrój.

References
Polish official population figures 2006

Labowa
Nowy Sącz County